The 2017 season is Grêmio Foot-Ball Porto Alegrense's 114th season in existence and the club's 12th consecutive season in the top division of Brazilian football. At this season, Grêmio will again participate in the Campeonato Brasileiro Série A, the Copa Libertadores, the Copa do Brasil, the Campeonato Gaúcho and the Primeira Liga.

Club

Staff

Board members
 President: Romildo Bolzan Jr.
 Vice-president: Adalberto Preis
 Vice-president: Antônio Dutra Júnior
 Vice-president: Cláudio Oderich
 Vice-president: Marcos Herrmann
 Vice-president: Sergei Costa
 Vice-president of football: Odorico Roman
 Football adviser: Alexandre Rolim
 Director of football: Saul Berdichevski
 Superintendent: Antônio Carlos Verardi
 Supervisor of football: Marcelo Rudolph

Coaching staff
 Manager:  Renato Portaluppi
 Assistant coach:  Alexandre Mendes
 Technical coordinator:  Valdir Espinosa
 Fitness coach:  Rogério Dias
 Assistant fitness coach:  Mário Pereira
 Assistant fitness coach:  Gabriel Alves
 Goalkeeper coach:  Rogério Godoy
 Performance analyst:  Eduardo Cecconi
 Performance analyst:  Antônio Cruz
 Performance analyst:  Rafael Tavares

Kit
Supplier: Umbro
Sponsor(s): Banrisul / Unimed

Squad information

First team squad
Players and informations last updated on 21 May 2017.Note: Flags indicate national team as has been defined under FIFA eligibility rules. Players may hold more than one non-FIFA nationality.

Starting XI
4–2–3–1 Formation

According to the most recent line-ups, not most used players (in Notes).

<div style="position: relative;">

Transfers

Transfers in

Transfers out

Total incoming:   Undisclosed (~£22,000,000+)

Loans in

Loans out

Competitions

Overview

Campeonato Gaúcho

Matches

Knockout stage

Matches

Quarter-finals

Semi-finals

Primeira Liga

Group stage

Group B

Matches

Knockout stage

Matches

Quarter-finals

Copa Libertadores

Group stage

Group 8

Matches

Final stage

Matches

Round of 16

Quarter-finals

Semi-finals

Final

Campeonato Brasileiro Série A

League table

Matches

Copa do Brasil

Matches

Round of 16

Quarter-finals

Semi-finals

FIFA Club World Cup

Semi-final

Final

Statistics

Appearances and goals

|-
! colspan="18" style="background:#E6E8FA; text-align:center"|Goalkeepers

|-
! colspan="16" style="background:#E6E8FA; text-align:center"|Defenders

|-
! colspan="16" style="background:#E6E8FA; text-align:center"|Midfielders

|-
! colspan="16" style="background:#E6E8FA; text-align:center"|Forwards

|-
! colspan="16" style="background:#E6E8FA; text-align:center"|Players who currently don't integrate the First team squad

                                      

|-

Goalscorers
The list include all goals in competitive matches.

As of 25 May 2017.
Source: Match reports in Competitions.

Assists
The list include all assists in competitive matches.

As of 25 May 2017.
Source: Match reports in Competitions.

Clean sheets

As of 25 May 2017.
Source: Match reports in Competitions.

References

2016 Season
Brazilian football clubs 2017 season
Gremio